Juraj Dovičovič (born 27 May 1980) is a Slovak former football midfielder. He represented Slovakia football team in a two international friendly matches against Ukraine football team on 28 April 2004 and then against Croatia football team a month and one day later.

Honours

Club 

 Djurgårdens IF 
 Svenska Cupen (1): 2004

References

External links

Juraj Dovičovič at playmakerstats.com (English version of fussballzz.de)

1980 births
Living people
Slovak footballers
Slovakia international footballers
Slovakia under-21 international footballers
Slovak expatriate footballers
Association football midfielders
FC Nitra players
FK Dubnica players
MFK Ružomberok players
FC Lokomotiv Moscow players
Djurgårdens IF Fotboll players
Zalaegerszegi TE players
Slovak Super Liga players
Russian Premier League players
Allsvenskan players
Nemzeti Bajnokság I players
Expatriate footballers in Russia
Expatriate footballers in Sweden
Expatriate footballers in Hungary
Sportspeople from Nitra